Giacomo Devoto (19 July 1897 – 25 December 1974) was an Italian historical linguist and one of the greatest exponents of the twentieth century of the discipline. He was born in Genoa and died in Florence.

Career
In 1939 he founded with Bruno Migliorini the magazine Lingua Nostra.

In January 1945, after the Liberation, along with Piero Calamandrei, Corrado Tumiati, Enzo Enriques Agnoletti and Paride Baccarini, he founded, in Florence, the Associazione  Federalisti Europei (AFE, its acronym – in English Association of European Federalists), uniting afterwards integrating into the European Federalist Movement founded by Altiero Spinelli, which between 1947–1948 had an important role.

He received several degrees "honoris causa" from the Paris, Basel, Strasbourg, Berlin (Humboldt), Krakow, Zagreb and Lima Universities.

He was President of the Accademia della Crusca from December 1963, Academician of Denmark and Finland, Glotología Emeritus and Rector of the Università degli Studi di Firenze.

He, along with Gian Carlo Oli, was the author of the Vocabolario Illustrato della lingua italiana (Illustrated Vocabulary of the Italian language) and of the Vocabolario della lingua Italiana Il Devoto-Oli (Vocabulary of the Italian language), edited by Luca Serianni and Maurizio Trifone.

He was one of the leading international experts on Indo-European languages (Origini indoeuropee, 1962), Latin (Storia della lingua di Roma published in 1940) and Italian (Avviamento alla etimologia italiana 1968, Il linguaggio d'Italia published in 1974, etc.). Among his contributions on Indo-European studies there is the elaboration of the concept of "Peri-Indo-European", i.e. everything that has hybrid characters between Indo-European and non-Indo-European. The term refers to both languages and territories but also peoples. The Peri-Indo-European can be seen as a rough Indo-European that was produced when traditions alien to the Indo-European were progressively altered by contact with the Indo-European. Devoto proposed and repeatedly supported the definition of the Etruscan language as Peri-Indo-European.

Publications
Antichi italici. 1931 (Ancient Italic Peoples)
Storia della lingua di Roma. Capelli Editore, 1991, I ed. 1939 (History of the language of Rome)
Studi di stilistica, 1950 (Studies in Stylistics)
I fondamenti della storia linguistica. 1951 (The foundations of linguistic history)
Profilo di storia linguistica italiana. 1953 (An Outline of Italian linguistic history)
Origini indoeuropee. Edizioni di Ar, [2008], I ed.1962 (Indo-European Origins)
I dialetti delle regioni d'Italia. Sansoni, Florencia 1972, con Gabriella Giacomelli (The dialects of the Italian regions)
Le origini e la lingua dei Lettoni en "Letonia". 1939 (Res Balticae 1997) (The origins of the Latvian language)
Le letterature dei paesi baltici, Sansoni 1969 (The literatures of the Baltic countries)

References

1897 births
1974 deaths
Writers from Genoa
Linguists from Italy
Dialectologists
20th-century linguists